Illarame Nallaram is a 1958 Indian Tamil-language film directed by P. Pullayya. The film stars Gemini Ganesan and Anjali Devi. It was released on 1 August 1958.

Plot

Cast 

Male cast
Gemini Ganesan as Venugopal
V. Nagayya as Selvaraj
M. N. Nambiar as Gopu
C. R. Parthiban
V. R. Rajagopal as Mannar
V. M. Ezhumalai
M. R. Santhanam
Anantharaman
Master Murali

Female cast
Anjali Devi as Lakshmi
M. V. Rajamma as Malathi
B. Sarojadevi as Sarala
P. S. Gnanam
K. Sooryakala
Rajeswari
Dance
 Kumari Kamala

Production 
B. Sarojadevi was introduced to Tamil cinema with this film. She was featured in a minor role as dancer Sarala. This film had a dance sequence of Saroja Devi and Kumari Kamala in Gevacolor.

Soundtrack 
Music was composed by K. G. Moorthy while the lyrics were penned by A. Maruthakasi, P. Hanumandha Rao, Ku. Ma. Balasubramaniam and K. V. Srinivasan.

References

External links 

1950s Tamil-language films
1958 drama films
Films directed by P. Pullayya
Indian drama films